{{Infobox comics character 
|character_name = King Tut
|image          = 
|imagesize      = 
|converted      = y
|caption        = 
|real_name      = William Omaha McElroy
|publisher      = DC Comics
|first_series   = Batman"The Curse of Tut" (April 13, 1966)'
|first_comic    = Batman Confidential #26 (April 2009)
|creators       = Earl Barret (writer)Robert C. Dennis (writer)Charles R. Rondeau (director)Victor Buono (actor)
|species        = Human
|homeworld      = 
|alliances      = 
|partners       = 
|supports       = 
|aliases        = Pharaoh
|powers         = 
|cat            = super
|subcat         = DC Comics
|hero           = 
|villain        = y
|sortkey        = King Tut (comics)
}}
King Tut is a fictional character in the television series Batman, who first appeared in the episode "The Curse of Tut" (April 13, 1966). He was created by Earl Barret, Robert C. Dennis and Charles R. Rondeau, and is portrayed by Victor Buono for a majority of his appearances, though Guy Way portrays King Tut in the episode "The Entrancing Dr. Cassandra". In his memoir Back to the Batcave, Adam West describes him as the only villain created for the series to be a real success.

Publication history
The character of King Tut started out on the Batman television line episodes of the series' original run.

Fictional character biography
Batman
Professor William Omaha McElroy is an Egyptologist at Yale University who suffers a blow to the head during a student riot that causes him to develop amnesia and believe he was a reincarnation of King Tut. Ever since, he would make several attempts to conquer Gotham City and defeat Batman, Robin, and later Batgirl, only to suffer more blows to the head that revert him to his original personality before he can succeed. Due to being cognizant of what happens during his time as King Tut, McElroy tries to prevent unwanted blows and personality shifts, though without success.

Throughout his appearances, King Tut's plans to take over Gotham have involved ancient scarab beetles capable of creating a potion that will allow him to control minds; gaining assistance from two Yale students who suffered their own blows to their heads and believe themselves to be King Tut's royal jester and Lord Chancellor; masquerading as a crime predictor and claiming Bruce Wayne is Batman while attempting to secure a scroll that will lead him to a god statue; and joining forces with Dr. Cassandra Spellcraft and Cabala, among other supervillains, in a bid to take over Gotham City in exchange for being allowed to rob Gotham's museums.

Most notably, in the episode "I'll Be a Mummy's Uncle", King Tut buys a plot of land adjacent to Wayne Manor so he can mine for a rare mineral. After tunneling underneath the manor and accidentally discovering the Batcave, he confirms Wayne and Batman are the same person, but gets hit on the head with a rock before he can reveal this to Commissioner Gordon.

DC Universe
A depiction of King Tut made his DC Comics Universe debut in Batman Confidential #26 (April 2009). This version was created by Christina Weir, Nunzio DeFilippis, and José Luis García-López. His alter-ego, Victor Goodman, is an homage to actor Victor Buono, since "Buono" is Italian for "good".

The comic book version of King Tut, Victor Goodman, is a criminal egyptologist who targets and murders wealthy citizens and leaves Egyptian-themed riddles, similar to the Riddle of the Sphinx. Batman teams up with the Riddler, who does not appreciate his modus operandi being stolen and agrees to help to stop Goodman. They manage to defeat King Tut, who is sent to prison until he is transferred to Arkham Asylum.

The character appears once again in the "DC Rebirth" in The Riddler: Year of the Villain as a friend of Edward Nygma. He is first shown talking to Nygma in an Egyptian-themed restaurant and Nygma tells him that he is angry and jealous that he has not received a visit from Lex Luthor (who has been visiting various villains across the DC Universe as part of a nefarious plan he is setting up). But after stating this, he eventually gets visited by Luthor anyway. King Tut then appears later on telling him that they should team up to outsmart Batman by working together and he initially agrees. After Batman goes through a complicated Egyptian puzzle set up by Tut, Riddler decides to quit and leaves, thinking about the advice Luthor gave him. Batman then knocks out Tut with a single punch.

In other media
Television
A character inspired by King Tut called the Pharaoh for copyright reasons appears in Batman: The Brave and the Bold, voiced by John DiMaggio. He wields a staff capable of turning people into obedient zombies and has been imprisoned in Iron Heights Penitentiary and Blackgate Penitentiary.

Film
 King Tut appears in Batman: Return of the Caped Crusaders.
 King Tut appears in The Lego Batman Movie as a member of the Joker's army.
 King Tut appears in Batman vs. Two-Face, voiced by Wally Wingert.

Miscellaneous
King Tut appears in Batman Unburied'' as a resident of Arkham Asylum.

See also
 List of Batman Family enemies

References

External links
 IMDB: Batman, The Curse of Tut
 IMDB: King Tut, Character Filmography
 King Tut Animated Sketch and info available.
 The 1966 Batman TV Villains – Victor Buono

Comics characters introduced in 2009
Television characters introduced in 1966
Fictional historians
DC Comics supervillains
DC Comics male supervillains
DC Comics television characters
Fictional crime bosses
Fictional characters with amnesia
American male characters in television